Highland Park, also known as Highland Pines, is a populated place situated near Prescott and within the Prescott National Forest, in Yavapai County, Arizona, United States. Highland Pines is the promotional name associated with the Highland Park areas several subdivisions. In the Arizona Territorial era up to 1912, and Statehood until around the late 1920s, this particular area of land acted as a cattle ranch with a mining history, lies within the Thumb Butte Mining District, which appears to be initially platted by the Arizona Corporation Highland Pine Properties Inc. beginning in the late 1950s.

History of the land
Highland Pines has a rich history of mining prospects, mining claims, and cattle ranching. It is located in the Sierra Prieta region, in the Thumb Butte mining district, near Iron Springs. During the late 1800s and early 1900s, lode mining claims were located by several different prospectors who identified these claims in and near Highland Pines under The Mining Act which allowed prospectors to survey and claim public lands in the western states. The stated purpose of this law was to open the mineral claims in the public lands of the United States to exploration and purchase (from the government).

A mine is a prospect which has graduated into a profitable undertaking. A property which does not profit, or one that is not up to this particular stage in its development, cannot yet meet the definition of a 'mine'. Not all prospects become mines, and not all mines stay or can stay profitable. The works treatment of a mines ore bodies has the requirement of one already having been thoroughly established, and also showing a continuing profit.

A financially viable treatment must be established in order for the classification of an established 'mine' to exist. It is a fraudulent misrepresentation to state upon public offerings of the company seeking prospective capital or further capital in a 'mine' when the property itself is likely nothing more than just a prospect. A prospect is a property were there is an expectation that mineral bearing ores may be obtained. A property that is a 'pit' by definition, is distinguished from a 'mine' in that stones are likely being removed, however the property is simply nothing more than a 'quarry'.  A prospect, a proved prospect, a mine an established mine have very different definitions.

Department of the Interior (DOI) decisions require a discovery on 'each claim based on an actual physical exposure of the mineral deposit within the claim boundaries.'  The DOI's holding in Jefferson-Montana Copper Mines Co., 41 L.D. 321 (1912), established the full test for a lode claim:

"To constitute a valid discovery upon a lode claim, three elements are necessary:

There must be a vein or lode of quartz or other rock-in-place; 
The quartz or other rock-in-place must carry gold or some other valuable mineral deposit;  
The two preceding elements, when taken together, must be such that as to warrant a prudent man in the expenditure of his time and money in the effort to develop a valuable mine.

The key word here is: valuable. As in a discovery (property) which holds monetarily exchangeable resources at a profit. This after the prudent man expends his time, his money, and his efforts, finds that those resources as allotted, are still financially valuable to him.

Derby Mining Company (Derby Mine)
In the early 1900s, the efforts promoting the sale of stock in the Derby Mining Company, and the later Madizelle Mining Company by George U. Young, resulted in the creation of United States land entry records, by way of the General Land Office in Arizona. George U. Young was a mining promoter in the Territory, publicly promoting himself, as well as his related mining prospects since the 1890s. In 1912, Geo. U. Young sat as a director on the Phoenix Real Estate Board, which also operated from the building block at 403-404 Fleming in downtown Phoenix, present site of the Wells Fargo tower. Young acted as president and lessee of the Derby Mining Company, E.M. Sanford was the vice president, R.H. Shoemaker it's secretary, and F.O. Polson as treasurer, publicly offering capital stock, which was primarily issued through brokers to investors on the east coast. Regularly used by Young was his office letterhead, which read: 'Stocks, Bonds, Lands, Investments; Land and Irrigation Projects Examined; Mine Reports a Specialty.' Young's mining prospects were well known throughout the Thumb Butte District, where present day Highland Park is centered.

From about 1902 to May 1907, George U. Young made many efforts in the area to fulfill his ultimate vision of the Derby Mining Company's land area, as a fixed visual representation of what became 'Derby Mines'. After a few lawsuits, some judgements, and at least a few accidental deaths, 'The Derby' was reborn.

On June 17, 1907, the U.S. Surveyor General for Arizona issued official survey instructions for mineral survey twenty four-twenty four to J.J. Fisher, a U.S. Deputy Mineral Surveyor. After mineral entry was made, this effort resulted in the foundation of present-day Highland Pines, the 'Plat of the (Mining) Claim of George U. Young, which was incorporated into land patent documents, to the later Madizelle Mining Co. Official records indicate the mineral plat represents twenty five lode mining claims situated in the Thumb Butte Mining District: Puritan, Puritan No. 2, Puritan No. 3, Iron Mask, Derby, Derby No. 2, Derby No. 3, Ellen No. 1, Ellen No. 2, Madizelle, Huguenot, Patsy, Humbert, Italian, Happy Strike, Sunny Side No. 1, Sunny Side, Surenough, Penos Alto No. 1, Penos Alto No. 2, Penos Alto no. 3, Highland, Knocker Doom, Protection No.2 and Protection #3.

Young is also associated with several other prospective lode mining claim location notices, for claims throughout the Highland Park area. One of his first locations is known as the 'Accidental' Lode Mining Claim. Additional lode mining claims situated in the Thumb Butte Mining District are the Isabella, Big Ben No. 1, Big Ben No. 2, Ellen M., Iona, Great Eastern, Last Chance (J.J. Fisher), Star, Lowry Hill, Lowry Cross, Ohio, Norman, Summit, Edgar, Alto, and Protection. Prominent locators working with Young in the early 1900s included Thomas Smith, Frank Polson, Thomas C. Hill, Silas 'S.P.' Hill, James R. Lowry, James Samuels, E.L. Sharpneck, George W. Sarano, Norman Hale, J.C. Forest, and Joseph Dougherty. The mining efforts here were all greatly served by the simple flag station with one switch, known by local miners as Summit Station otherwise known as Sierra Prieta on the Santa Fe, Prescott and Phoenix Railway. This was promoted as the main delivery system for the hauling of heavy equipment to the mining activity in the area. One source identifies the intention in the early 1900s to have had the former railroad connect along the ridge to present day Highland Pines, up to two miles to the south, from Prieta flag station.

Cattle ranching
While simultaneously forging forward with plans for the land under the provisions of the Mining Act, the area related to Young's 'Derby Mines' was doubling as a literal cattle ranch, complete with pastures, wire fencing, corrals, hay bale deliveries and open range for the various stock, which was initially kept under a watchful eye of a full-time caretaker named J.E. 'the old man' Wilson. The future of the cattle business in the area redirected the interests of several of the original Lode claimants, beginning in the latter part of the 1880s, when the original vein of the Lowry was discovered.

After the passing of Dan Goggin, Wilson resided in one of several homes constructed at the heart of what he promoted to be the Derby. After the death of the first caretaker, George U. Young placed a wanted ad in the Republic, which read: 'Wanted-Man and wife...to look after stock and do general work; wife to work around the house and must be a good cook.' Ultimately in about December 1912, a man named Fred J. Smith from the nearby Centipede Mine, where he was already working for the interests of George U. Young, came to what was referred to as the Derby area with his wife Ada E. Smith, where they resided with for many years.

Madizelle Mining Company
On June 6, 1908, the Madizelle Mining Company was incorporated under the laws of the Territory of Arizona. The incorporators were Andrew A. Blair (President), J. Edward Whitfield (Secretary & Treasurer), Fred W. Taylor (Director), Charles M. Taylor Jr. (Director), of Philadelphia, Pennsylvania, all of the City of Philadelphia, County of Philadelphia, State of Pennsylvania and George U. Young (Vice President & General Manager) of Prescott, County of Yavapai, Territory of Arizona.

The nature of business as listed on the companies Articles of Incorporation: 'A general mining, milling and smelting business, buying, selling, bonding, etc., mines, mining claims, water rights, ores and bullion; building roads, etc.; to acquire mining property water rights, etc., and to work the same; to mine for gold, silver, copper, etc.; to sell, mortgage or otherwise dispose of the property of the company; to deal in its own stock and that of other corporations, etc. etc.'

On October 26, 1916, an amendment was made to the articles of incorporation of the Madizelle Mining Company. Near the time of application for land patent, Young was given power of attorney on behalf of the Madizelle Mining Company. On March 6, 1920, Application 045620 for Phoenix Serial Patent 818495 was made by the Madizelle Mining Company for certain lands embraced in Mineral Survey No. 2424. Included in the application for patent was the Field Notes of the survey of the mining claims, Power of attorney from Madizellle Mining Company to George U. Young, Proof of posting notice and diagram on claim, Three copies of the notice for publication, One notice of application for patent, Certificate and proper authority showing Madizelle Mining Company duly organized and prepared to do business within the State, Plat of survey of said mining claims approved by the Surveyor General.

Letter from Fen S. Hildreth on behalf of the Madizelle Mining Company, dated June 30, 1920, included 'tender in connection therewith check payable to the receiver of public moneys in the sum of $2100.00, in payment for the land.' This was at the government rate of $5.00 U.S. per acre. The Register of the General Land Office issued a Final Certificate of Mineral Entry for George U. Young's mining claim containing the twenty five claims as embraced in Mineral Survey 2424, accepting the purchase money, and issuing receipt no. 2478801, also dated July 1, 1920.

Highland Pine Properties

Highland Pines is generally situated about two miles to the south on scenic Skyline Drive from Iron Springs Road, at elevations above  on the Sierra Prieta divide between Skull Valley and Prescott, and between the mountain of antiquity 'Granite Mountain' (ancient summer home of the Yavapai-Apache) to the north and West Spruce & Porter Mountain on the south. This unique position affords panoramic views over Prescott & Thumb Butte Mountain to the east and a vista of nearly one hundred miles to the west from the highest locations.

 

The company Highland Pine Properties, Inc. was incorporated in Arizona in the mid-1950s by president J. Earl Wilson "The Brains", vice-president Elmer J. Winternheimer "The Bucks" and Jean C. Wilson, who are also former residents of Highland Pines. Joe D. Yancey was the acting secretary for the company. The company was located at 9810 N. 5th Ave Phoenix, Arizona, and made various subdivided plats and marketed property primarily for summer cottages that offered out of town buyers "A Way of Life" through "A World of Recreation". Later sales promoted the area as "Your Own Private Retreat in the Heart of Nature's Wonderland" to retiree's building year-round homes.

Many of the sales were ultimately sold by word of mouth and financed by Highland Pine Properties Inc., which required only a "nominal amount of money as a down payment for a lot, usually about ten percent, the balance with easy monthly budget payments". Initially, there were only sixty-five cabin homes completed, with home site prices at a mere $1495 for standard lots, and later increased to $1995 for the remaining offerings with "unparalleled views surrounded by the Prescott National Forest". The company released Highland Pine in various phases beginning in 1957, and continuing into the 1970s.

The initial dream was for the community to have a clubhouse with full recreational facilities, but this never transpired. The historical home on present day North Skyline Drive acted as the original General Store for Highland Pines during the early 1960s. Not long after selling the lots, the communities water supply, which originally derived from an old nearby mining shaft, ran woefully inadequate. Ultimately, by the 1970s, Highland Pine began receiving water from a pipeline through the forest, from the City of Prescott.

J. Earl Wilson is mainly responsible for naming the initial roads in Highland Pines. Many of the names are taken from the land aspects, some even named after related Lode location notices, like Sunny Side Lane and Madizelle Drive. Promotional material by the Highland Pine Properties provided investors "A full chapter of Arizona's gold mining history at your doorstep with the location and relics of the old 'Derby Mine' being the focal point for the entire development." Present day, the Highland Park/Highland Pines area is occupied by several hundred homes, with few remaining vacant lots.

Restrictions were initially placed by Highland Pines Properties which required new homes to be built with a minimum of 500 square feet, complementing the areas appearance regardless of size. The plan and the location on the individual lots was to be approved by the Highland Pine Development Corporation, with no city or trailer size lots provided. Electricity and water to the lot line, all planned and paid for by Highland Pine Properties, Inc., water supplied by the Highland Pine Water Company. The former restrictions are no longer in existence, and the Highland Pine Companies since defunct.

Gallery

See also
Spenazuma, Arizona
Arizona Geological Survey
Youngberg, Arizona
Goldfield, Arizona
Iron Springs, Arizona
Iron Springs Recreation Area
Prospecting

References

External links
 1866 Mining Act, An Act granting the Right of Way to Ditch and Canal Owners over the Public Lands, and for other Purposes
 The General Mining Act of 1872
 Anatomy of a Mine from the United States Geological Survey
 Mining Claim Information, US Bureau of Land Management
 USDA, Forest Service, Anatomy of a Mine from Prospect to Production, 1995
 Locatable Minerals, Mining Claims, BLM
 Looters_of_the_Public_Domain_1908 (Arizona)
 History of the Prescott National Forest: 1800's to Present
 Revised Instructions to U.S. Deputy MINERAL SURVEYORS for the District of Arizona, Royal A. Johnson, 1892
 Manual of Instructions for the Survey of Public Lands of the United States, 1930
 Mineral Survey Procedures Guide, Department of the Interior, 1980
 https://www.blm.gov/or/gis/geoscience/files/lost_oblit.pdf
 https://www.ntc.blm.gov/krc/uploads/538/1909_Restoration_of_Lost_or_Obliterated_Corners.pdf
 Manual of Surveying Instructions, 2009, Department of the Interior
 BLM 2009 Manual-Mineral_Surveys.pdf
 MS 2424, 1907 (with revisions, Arizona Land Office version), Mineral Survey 2424 Field Notes, Final Oaths for Surveys, U.S. Surveyor General's Final Certificate on Filed Notes, Surveyor General's Certificate of Approval of Field Notes and Survey of Mining Claim, Department of the Interior
 Arizona Geological Survey, Derby Mine, Derby Mining Company, Derby Mine File
 Arizona Geological Survey, mining scams
 BLM Policy 2015 Administration of Mining Claims, Mill Sites, and Tunnel Sites
 Mining Claims and Sites on Federal Lands Brochure, 2021

Populated places in Yavapai County, Arizona